Ruth of the Range is a fifteen episode American adventure film serial starring Ruth Roland, in which a young woman attempts to rescue her father from a gang that has kidnapped him in order to find out his secret for making "Fuelite," a substitute for coal. The film was the final feature created by scenarist Gilson Willets for Pathe Productions, and is now thought to be a lost film.

Episodes
 The Last Shot
 The Seething Pit
 The Danger Trail
 The Terror Train
 The Temple Dungeon
 The Pitfall
 The Fatal Count
 The Dynamite Plot
 The Lava Crusher
 Circumstantial Evidence
 The Desert of Death
 The Vital Test
 The Molten Menace
 Cancelled Orders
 Promises Fulfilled

Cast
Ruth Roland	...	Ruth Remington
Bruce Gordon	...	Bruce Burton
Lorimer Johnston	...	Peter Van Dyke
Ernest C. Warde	...	Robert Remington
Pat Harmon	...	Jim Stain
Andrée Peyre	...	Judith
Harry De Vere		...	J. Hamilton Camp
V. Omar Whitehead		...	Captain X

Production

The series had three directors: the credited director was Ernest C. Warde, son of famed actor Frederick Warde, and was reportedly fired for filming too many close-ups of Roland; his replacement, W. S. Van Dyke, soon quit for another job; and Frank Leon Smith was hired to complete the serial. Gillets died during filming but before he had completed the script, leaving Smith to create his own story from existing footage. Roland left the feature before filming was complete, so Smith filmed her final scenes using her stuntman, Bob Rose, wearing a wig.

See also
List of lost films

References

External links

1923 films
American silent serial films
Lost American films
1920s adventure films
American black-and-white films
American adventure films
1920s lost films
Films directed by Ernest C. Warde
1920s American films
Silent adventure films